Elk is an unincorporated rural community in northern Spokane County, Washington, United States.

There is also a VFW, Volunteer Fire Station, and other amenities. During the summer Elk holds Elk Days, when it celebrates Fathers' Day and the community's history. The community gathers, usually at Elk Park, to celebrate with various vendors and festivities often including a car show and parade.

Geography
Elk is located on the upper reaches of the Little Spokane River. The surrounding area consists of forests and farmland with the foothills of the Selkirk Mountains rising a few miles from town in almost all directions. The town is located 3.5 miles east of U.S. Route 2, a major highway and thoroughfare in the region connecting the Elk area to larger nearby cities with more services like Newport, Washington to the north and Spokane, Washington to the south. Elk is located roughly two miles south of the Spokane-Pend Oreille county line.

History

The community was originally named Peddit's Township of Elk.

 A post office in Elk has been in operation since 1892. The current post office sits on the site of the Elk Hotel, which was destroyed by fire in the early 1970s. A one room schoolhouse was built in 1902. The town is now served by the Riverside School District, which covers most of rural northern Spokane County.

References

Unincorporated communities in Spokane County, Washington
Unincorporated communities in Washington (state)